The Lutheran Synod of Buffalo, founded in 1845 as the Synod of Lutheran Emigrants from Prussia, was commonly known from early in its history as the Buffalo Synod. The synod resulted from the efforts of pastor J. A. A. Grabau and members of his congregation in Erfurt, along with other congregations, to escape the forced union of Lutheran and Reformed churches in Prussia by immigrating to New York City and Buffalo, New York, and to Milwaukee, Wisconsin, in 1839. Grabau and the largest group settled in Buffalo. Internal disputes regarding theology and practice led to a major schism in the 1860s, with the departing congregations joining other, existing synods, rather than forming their own. In 1930, the synod merged with the Ohio Synod and the Iowa Synod to form the first instance of the American Lutheran Church (ALC). The latter body, after further mergers, became part of the Evangelical Lutheran Church in America in 1988.

In 1929, just before its merger into the ALC, the Buffalo Synod had 45 pastors, 54 congregations, and 7,981 members.

Notes

References

External links
 Kriegbaum-Hanks, Susan: A Brief History of the Old Lutheran Immigrants and the Buffalo Synod: 1838 - 1867

History of Christianity in the United States
Evangelical Lutheran Church in America predecessor churches
Lutheran denominations in North America
Religious organizations established in 1845
Lutheran denominations established in the 19th century
1845 establishments in New York (state)
History of Milwaukee